The Second Palaszczuk Ministry is a ministry of the Government of Queensland led by Annastacia Palaszczuk. Palaszczuk led the Labor Party to a majority victory in the 2017 state election.

Initial ministry
On 11 December 2017, Premier Palaszczuk announced a new line up for the ministry. The ministry was sworn in by the Governor on 12 December 2017. It is made up of nine men and nine women.

May 2020 reshuffle
In May 2020, a minor reshuffle occurred following the resignation of Deputy Premier Jackie Trad. Health Minister Steven Miles was appointed Deputy Premier of Queensland, while Cameron Dick was appointed Treasurer of Queensland.

See also
Shadow ministry of Deb Frecklington

References

Queensland ministries
Australian Labor Party ministries in Queensland